British American Railway Services (BARS) was a British locomotive and spot hire company. It was a subsidiary of Iowa Pacific Holdings.

The company was established in 2008 to acquire the rail assets of Ealing Community Transport.

BARS subsidiaries included RMS Locotec, Hanson Traction, Weardale Railway and Dartmoor Railway. BARS also owned Devon & Cornwall Railways which was active from 2011 until 2017.  In January 2020 BARS announced that it intended to dispose of all its UK assets.

References

Rolling stock leasing companies
Post-privatisation British railway companies